Messingham is a village in Lincolnshire, England.

Messingham may also refer to:

 Simon Messingham, British science fiction writer
 Richard Massingham (1898–1953), British actor
 Robert Messingham (born 1396), English politician
 Thomas Messingham (17th century), Irish hagiologist

See also
 Massingham (disambiguation)
 Missingham, a surname